The Women's 3000 metres event was held January 31. 9 athletes participated. The final was held from 15:05–15:32.

Schedule
All times are Almaty Time (UTC+06:00)

Records

Results

References

Women 3000